Mass killings under communist regimes occurred through a variety of means during the 20th century, including executions, famine, deaths through forced labour, deportation, starvation, and imprisonment. Some of these events have been classified as genocides or crimes against humanity. Other terms have been used to describe these events, including classicide, democide, red holocaust, and politicide. The mass killings have been studied by authors and academics and several of them have postulated the potential causes of these killings along with the factors which were associated with them. Some authors have tabulated a total death toll, consisting of all of the excess deaths which cumulatively occurred under the rule of communist states, but these death toll estimates have been criticized. Most frequently, the states and events which are studied and included in death toll estimates are the Holodomor and the Great Purge in the Soviet Union, the Great Chinese Famine and the Cultural Revolution in the People's Republic of China, and the Cambodian genocide in Democratic Kampuchea (now Cambodia) .

The concept of connecting disparate killings to the status of the communist states which committed them and the concept of trying to ascribe common causes and factors to them have both been supported and criticized by the academic community. Some academics view it as an indictment of communism as an ideology, while other academics view it as being overly simplistic and they also view it as being rooted in anti-communism. Instead, some academics attribute the causes of the killings to either the political systems or the leaders of the communist states. There is also debate over whether or not the famines which occurred during the rule of communist states can be considered mass killings. Mass killings which were committed by communist states have been compared to killings which were committed by other types of states.

Monuments to the victims of communism exist in almost all the capitals of Eastern Europe and one in Washington, D.C. A memorial is currently under construction in Ottawa, Canada.

Terminology and usage 

Several different terms are used to describe the intentional killing of large numbers of noncombatants. According to historian Anton Weiss-Wendt, the field of comparative genocide studies has very "little consensus on defining principles such as definition of genocide, typology, application of a comparative method, and timeframe." According to professor of economics Attiat Ott, mass killing has emerged as a "more straightforward" term.

The following terminology has been used by individual authors to describe mass killings of unarmed civilians by communist governments, individually or as a whole:
 Classicide – sociologist Michael Mann has proposed classicide to mean the "intended mass killing of entire social classes." Classicide is considered "premeditated mass killing" narrower than genocide in that it targets a part of a population defined by its social status, but broader than politicide in that the group is targeted without regard to their political activity.
 Crime against humanity – historian Klas-Göran Karlsson uses crimes against humanity, which includes "the direct mass killings of politically undesirable elements, as well as forced deportations and forced labour." Karlsson acknowledges that the term may be misleading in the sense that the regimes targeted groups of their own citizens, but he considers it useful as a broad legal term which emphasizes attacks on civilian populations and because the offenses demean humanity as a whole. Historian Jacques Sémelin and  Mann believe that crime against humanity is more appropriate than genocide or politicide when speaking of violence by communist regimes.
 Democide – political scientist Rudolph Rummel defined democide as "the intentional killing of an unarmed or disarmed person by government agents acting in their authoritative capacity and pursuant to government policy or high command." His definition covers a wide range of deaths, including forced labor and concentration camp victims, killings by "unofficial" private groups, extrajudicial summary killings, and mass deaths due to the governmental acts of criminal omission and neglect, such as in deliberate famines as well as killings by de facto governments, such as warlords or rebels in a civil war. This definition covers any murder of any number of persons by any government, and it has been applied to killings that were perpetrated by communist regimes.
 Genocide – under the Genocide Convention, the crime of genocide generally applies to the mass murder of ethnic rather than political or social groups. The clause which granted protection to political groups was eliminated from the United Nations resolution after a second vote because many states, including the Soviet Union under Joseph Stalin, feared that it could be used to impose unneeded limitations on their right to suppress internal disturbances. Scholarly studies of genocide usually acknowledge the UN's omission of economic and political groups and use mass political killing datasets of democide and genocide and politicide or geno-politicide. The killings that were committed by the Khmer Rouge in Cambodia has been labeled a genocide or an autogenocide, and the deaths that occurred under Leninism and Stalinism in the Soviet Union, as well as those that occurred under Maoism in China, have been controversially investigated as possible cases. In particular, the Soviet famine of 1930–1933 and the Great Chinese Famine, which occurred during the Great Leap Forward, have both been "depicted as instances of mass killing underpinned by genocidal intent."
 Red holocaust – the term, which was coined by the Munich Institut für Zeitgeschichte, has been used by professor of comparative economic systems Steven Rosefielde for communist "peacetime state killings", while stating that it "could be defined to include all murders (judicially sanctioned terror-executions), criminal manslaughter (lethal forced labor and ethnic cleansing), and felonious negligent homicide (terror-starvation) incurred from insurrectionary actions and civil wars prior to state seizure, and all subsequent felonious state killings." According to historian Jörg Hackmann, this term is not popular among scholars in Germany or internationally. Historian Alexandra Laignel-Lavastine writes that usage of this term "allows the reality it describes to immediately attain, in the Western mind, a status equal to that of the extermination of the Jews by the Nazi regime." Political scientist Michael Shafir writes that the use of the term supports the "competitive martyrdom component of Double Genocide", a theory whose worst version is Holocaust obfuscation. Professor of political science George Voicu wrote that Leon Volovici, a literary historian of Jewish culture, has "rightfully condemned the abusive use of this concept as an attempt to 'usurp' and undermine a symbol specific to the history of European Jews." 
 Mass killing – professor of psychology Ervin Staub defined mass killing as "killing members of a group without the intention to eliminate the whole group or killing large numbers of people without a precise definition of group membership. In a mass killing the number of people killed is usually smaller than in genocide." Referencing earlier definitions, Professors of economics Joan Esteban, Massimo Morelli, and Dominic Rohner have defined mass killings as "the killings of substantial numbers of human beings, when not in the course of military action against the military forces of an avowed enemy, under the conditions of the essential defenselessness and helplessness of the victims." The term has been defined by political scientist Benjamin Valentino as "the intentional killing of a massive number of noncombatants", where a "massive number" is defined as at least 50,000 intentional deaths over the course of five years or less. This is the most accepted quantitative minimum threshold for the term. He applied this definition to the cases of Stalin's Soviet Union, China under Mao Zedong and Cambodia under the Khmer Rouge while admitting that "mass killings on a smaller scale" also appear to have been carried out by regimes in North Korea, Vietnam, Eastern Europe, and various nations in Africa. Alongside Valentino, political scientist Jay Ulfelder has used a threshold of 1,000 killed. Professor of peace and conflict studies Alex J. Bellamy states that 14 of the 38 instances of "mass killing since 1945 perpetrated by non-democratic states outside the context of war" were by communist governments. Professor of political science Atsushi Tago and professor of international relations Frank W. Wayman used mass killing from Valentino and concluded that even with a lower threshold (10,000 killed per year, 1,000 killed per year, or even 1 killed per year) "autocratic regimes, especially communist, are prone to mass killing generically, but not so strongly inclined (i.e. not statistically significantly inclined) toward geno-politicide." According to professor of economics Attiat F. Ott and associate professor of economics Sang Hoo Bae, there is a general consensus that mass killing constitutes the act of intentionally killing a number of non-combatants, but that number can range from as few as four to more than 50,000 people. Sociologist Yang Su used a definition of mass killing from Valentino but allows as a "significant number" more than 10 killed in one day in one town. He used collective killing for analysis of mass killing in areas smaller than a whole country that may not meet Valentino's threshold.
 Politicide – genocide scholar Barbara Harff defines genocide and politicide, sometimes shortened as geno-politicide, to include the killing of political, economic, ethnic, and cultural groups, some of whom would not otherwise be covered by the Genocide Convention. Political science Manus I. Midlarsky uses politicide to describe an arc of large-scale killing from the western parts of the Soviet Union to China and Cambodia. In his book The Killing Trap: Genocide in the Twentieth Century, Midlarsky raises similarities between the killings of Stalin and Pol Pot.

Estimates 

According to historian Klas-Göran Karlsson, discussions of the number of victims of communist regimes have been "extremely extensive and ideologically biased." Any attempt to estimate a total number of killings under communist regimes depends greatly on definitions, ranging from a low of 10–20 million to as high as 148 million. Political scientist Rudolph Rummel and historian Mark Bradley have written that, while the exact numbers have been in dispute, the order of magnitude is not. Professor Barbara Harff says that Rummel and other genocide scholars are focused primarily on establishing patterns and testing various theoretical explanations of genocides and mass killings. They work with large data sets that describe mass mortality events globally, and have to rely on selective data provided by country experts; researchers cannot expect absolute precision, and it is not required as a result of their work.

Any attempt to estimate a total number of killings under communist regimes depends greatly on definitions. Historian Alexander Dallin argued that the idea to group together different countries such as Afghanistan and Hungary has no adequate explanation. During the Cold War era, some authors (Todd Culberston), dissidents (Aleksandr Solzhenitsyn), and anti-communists in general have attempted to make both country-specific and global estimates. Scholars of communism have mainly focused on individual countries, and genocide scholars have attempted to provide a more global perspective, while maintaining that their goal is not reliability but establishing patterns. Scholars of communism have debated on estimates for the Soviet Union, not for all communist regimes, an attempt which was popularized by the introduction to The Black Book of Communism which was controversial. Among them, Soviet specialists Michael Ellman and J. Arch Getty have criticized the estimates for relying on émigré sources, hearsay, and rumor as evidence, and cautioned that historians should instead utilize archive material. Such scholars distinguish between historians who base their research on archive materials, and those whose estimates are based on witnesses evidence and other data that is unreliable. Soviet specialist Stephen G. Wheatcroft says that historians relied on Solzhenitsyn to support their higher estimates but research in the state archives vindicated the lower estimates, and that the popular press has continued to include serious errors that should not be cited, or relied on, in academia. Rummel was also another widely used and cited source but not reliable about estimates.

Notable estimate attempts include the following:
 In 1993, Zbigniew Brzezinski, former National Security Advisor to Jimmy Carter, wrote that "the failed effort to build communism in the twentieth century consumed the lives of almost 60,000,000."
 In 1994, Rummel's book Death by Government included about 110 million people, foreign and domestic, killed by communist democide from 1900 to 1987. This total excluded deaths from the Great Chinese Famine of 1958–1961 due to Rummel's then belief that "although Mao's policies were responsible for the famine, he was misled about it, and finally when he found out, he stopped it and changed his policies." Rummel would later revise his estimate from 110 million to about 148 million due to additional information about Mao's culpability in the Great Chinese Famine from Mao: The Unknown Story, including Jon Halliday and Jung Chang's estimated 38 million famine deaths.
 In 2004, historian Tomislav Dulić criticized Rummel's estimate of the number killed in Tito's Yugoslavia as an overestimation based on the inclusion of low-quality sources, and stated that Rummel's other estimates may suffer from the same problem if he used similar sources for them. Rummel responded with a critique of Dulić's analysis. Karlsson says that Rummel's thesis of "extreme intentionality in Mao" for the famine is "hardly an example of a serious and empirically-based writing of history", and describes Rummel's 61,911,000 estimate for the Soviet Union as being based on "an ideological preunderstanding and speculative and sweeping calculations".
 In 1997, historian Stéphane Courtois's introduction to The Black Book of Communism, an impactful yet controversial work written about the history of communism in the 20th century, gave a "rough approximation, based on unofficial estimates". The subtotals listed by Courtois added up to 94.36 million killed. Nicolas Werth and Jean-Louis Margolin, contributing authors to the book, criticized Courtois as obsessed with reaching a 100 million overall total. 
 In his foreword to the 1999 English edition, Martin Malia wrote that "a grand total of victims variously estimated by contributors to the volume at between 85 million and 100 million." Historian Michael David-Fox states that Malia is able to link disparate regimes, from radical Soviet industrialists to the anti-urbanists of the Khmer Rouge, under the guise of a "generic communism" category "defined everywhere down to the common denominator of party movements founded by intellectuals." Courtois' attempt to equate Nazism and communist regimes was not fruitful on both scientific and moral grounds, because such comparisons are generally controversial. 
 In 2005, professor Benjamin Valentino stated that the number of non-combatants killed by communist regimes in the Soviet Union, China, and Cambodia alone ranged from a low of 21 million to a high of 70 million. 
 In 2010, professor of economics Steven Rosefielde wrote in Red Holocaust that the internal contradictions of communist regimes caused the killing of approximately 60 million people and perhaps tens of millions more.
 In 2012, academic Alex J. Bellamy wrote that a "conservative estimate puts the total number of civilians deliberately killed by communists after the Second World War between 6.7 million and 15.5 million people, with the true figure probably much higher."
 In 2014, professor of Chinese politics Julia Strauss wrote that while there was the beginning of a scholarly consensus on figures of around 20 million killed in the Soviet Union and 2–3 million in Cambodia, there was no such consensus on numbers for China.
 In 2017, historian Stephen Kotkin wrote in The Wall Street Journal that 65 million people died prematurely under communist regimes according to demographers, and those deaths were a result of "mass deportations, forced labor camps and police-state terror" but mostly "from starvation as a result of its cruel projects of social engineering."

Criticism of estimates 
Criticism of the estimates are mostly focused on three aspects, namely that the estimates are based on sparse and incomplete data when significant errors are inevitable, the figures are skewed to higher possible values, and victims of civil wars, Holodomor, and other famines, and wars involving communist governments should not be counted. Criticism also includes that these estimates ignore lives saved by communist modernization and that they engage in comparisons and equations with Nazism, which are described by scholars as Holocaust obfuscation, Holocaust trivialization, and anti-communist oversimplifications. In addition, the communist grouping as applied by Courtois and Malia in The Black Book of Communism has been claimed to have no adequate explanation by historian Alexander Dallin, and Malia is able to link disparate regimes, from radical Soviet industrialists to the anti-urbanists of the Khmer Rouge, under the guise of a "generic communism" category "defined everywhere down to the common denominator of party movements founded by intellectuals." However, alongside philosopher Scott Sehon, Ghodsee wrote that "quibbling about numbers is unseemly. What matters is that many, many people were killed by communist regimes."

Criticism of Rummel's estimates have focused on two aspects, namely his choice of data sources and his statistical approach. According to Barbara Harff, the historical sources Rummel based his estimates upon can rarely serve as sources of reliable figures. The statistical approach Rummel used to analyze big sets of diverse estimates may lead to dilution of useful data with noisy ones.

Another criticism, as articulated by ethnographer and postsocialist gender studies scholar Kristen Ghodsee and political scientist Laure Neumayer, is that the body-counting reflects an anti-communist point of view, is mainly approached by anti-communist scholars, and is part of the popular "victims of communism" narrative, who have frequently used the 100 million figure from the introduction to The Black Book of Communism, which is used not only to discredit the communist movement, but the whole political left. They say the same body-counting can be easily applied to other ideologies or systems, such as capitalism and colonialism.

Proposed causes and enabling factors 

Communist party mass killings have been criticized by members of the political right, who state that the mass killings are an indictment of communism as an ideology, and has also been criticized by other socialists such as anarchists, communists, democratic socialists, libertarian socialists, and Marxists. Opponents of this hypothesis, including those on the political left and communist party members, state that these killings were aberrations caused by specific authoritarian regimes, and not caused by communism itself, and point to mass deaths that they say were caused by anti-communism and capitalism as a counterpoint to those killings.

Ideology 
Historian Klas-Göran Karlsson writes: "Ideologies are systems of ideas, which cannot commit crimes independently. However, individuals, collectives and states that have defined themselves as communist have committed crimes in the name of communist ideology, or without naming communism as the direct source of motivation for their crimes." John Gray, Daniel Goldhagen, and Richard Pipes consider the ideology of communism to be a significant causative factor in mass killings. In the introduction to The Black Book of Communism, Stéphane Courtois claims an association between communism and criminality, stating that "Communist regimes ... turned mass crime into a full-blown system of government", while adding that this criminality lies at the level of ideology rather than state practice.

Professor Mark Bradley writes that communist theory and practice has often been in tension with human rights and most communist states followed the lead of Karl Marx in rejecting "Enlightenment-era inalienable individual political and civil rights" in favor of "collective economic and social rights." Christopher J. Finlay posits that Marxism legitimates violence without any clear limiting principle because it rejects moral and ethical norms as constructs of the dominant class, and states that "it would be conceivable for revolutionaries to commit atrocious crimes in bringing about a socialist system, with the belief that their crimes will be retroactively absolved by the new system of ethics put in place by the proletariat." Rustam Singh states that Marx had alluded to the possibility of peaceful revolution; after the failed Revolutions of 1848, Singh states that Marx emphasized the need for violent revolution and revolutionary terror.

Literary historian George Watson cited an 1849 article written by Friedrich Engels called "The Hungarian Struggle" and published in Marx's journal Neue Rheinische Zeitung, and commented that "entire nations would be left behind after a workers' revolution against the bourgeoisie, feudal remnants in a socialist age, and since they could not advance two steps at a time, they would have to be killed. They were racial trash, as Engels called them, and fit only for the dung-heap of history." One book review criticized this interpretation, maintaining that "what Marx and Engels are calling for is ... at the very least a kind of cultural genocide; but it is not obvious, at least from Watson's citations, that actual mass killing, rather than (to use their phraseology) mere 'absorption' or 'assimilation', is in question." Talking about Engels' 1849 article, historian Andrzej Walicki states: "It is difficult to deny that this was an outright call for genocide." Jean-François Revel writes that Joseph Stalin recommended study of the 1849 Engels article in his 1924 book On Lenin and Leninism.

According to Rummel, the killings committed by communist regimes can best be explained as the result of the marriage between absolute power and the absolutist ideology of Marxism. Rummel states that "communism was like a fanatical religion. It had its revealed text and its chief interpreters. It had its priests and their ritualistic prose with all the answers. It had a heaven, and the proper behavior to reach it. It had its appeal to faith. And it had its crusades against nonbelievers. What made this secular religion so utterly lethal was its seizure of all the state's instruments of force and coercion and their immediate use to destroy or control all independent sources of power, such as the church, the professions, private businesses, schools, and the family." Rummels writes that Marxist communists saw the construction of their utopia as "though a war on poverty, exploitation, imperialism and inequality. And for the greater good, as in a real war, people are killed. And, thus, this war for the communist utopia had its necessary enemy casualties, the clergy, bourgeoisie, capitalists, wreckers, counterrevolutionaries, rightists, tyrants, rich, landlords, and noncombatants that unfortunately got caught in the battle. In a war millions may die, but the cause may be well justified, as in the defeat of Hitler and an utterly racist Nazism. And to many communists, the cause of a communist utopia was such as to justify all the deaths."

Benjamin Valentino writes that "apparently high levels of political support for murderous regimes and leaders should not automatically be equated with support for mass killing itself. Individuals are capable of supporting violent regimes or leaders while remaining indifferent or even opposed to specific policies that these regimes and carried out." Valentino quotes Vladimir Brovkin as saying that "a vote for the Bolsheviks in 1917 was not a vote for Red Terror or even a vote for a dictatorship of the proletariat." According to Valentino, such strategies were so violent because they economically dispossess large numbers of people, commenting: "Social transformations of this speed and magnitude have been associated with mass killing for two primary reasons. First, the massive social dislocations produced by such changes have often led to economic collapse, epidemics, and, most important, widespread famines. ... The second reason that communist regimes bent on the radical transformation of society have been linked to mass killing is that the revolutionary changes they have pursued have clashed inexorably with the fundamental interests of large segments of their populations. Few people have proved willing to accept such far-reaching sacrifices without intense levels of coercion." According to Jacques Sémelin, "communist systems emerging in the twentieth century ended up destroying their own populations, not because they planned to annihilate them as such, but because they aimed to restructure the 'social body' from top to bottom, even if that meant purging it and recarving it to suit their new Promethean political imaginaire."

Daniel Chirot and Clark McCauley write that, especially in Joseph Stalin's Soviet Union, Mao Zedong's China, and Pol Pot's Cambodia, a fanatical certainty that socialism could be made to work motivated communist leaders in "the ruthless dehumanization of their enemies, who could be suppressed because they were 'objectively' and 'historically' wrong. Furthermore, if events did not work out as they were supposed to, then that was because class enemies, foreign spies and saboteurs, or worst of all, internal traitors were wrecking the plan. Under no circumstances could it be admitted that the vision itself might be unworkable, because that meant capitulation to the forces of reaction." Michael Mann writes that communist party members were "ideologically driven, believing that in order to create a new socialist society, they must lead in socialist zeal. Killings were often popular, the rank-and-file as keen to exceed killing quotas as production quotas." According to Vladimir Tismăneanu, "the Communist project, in such countries as the USSR, China, Cuba, Romania, or Albania, was based precisely on the conviction that certain social groups were irretrievably alien and deservedly murdered." Alex Bellamy writes that "communism's ideology of selective extermination" of target groups was first developed and applied by Joseph Stalin but that "each of the communist regimes that massacred large numbers of civilians during the Cold War developed their own distinctive account", while Steven T. Katz states that distinctions based on class and nationality, stigmatized and stereotyped in various ways, created an "otherness" for victims of communist rule that was important for legitimating oppression and death. Martin Shaw writes that "nationalist ideas were at the heart of many mass killings by Communist states", beginning with Stalin's "new nationalist doctrine of 'socialism in one country'", and killing by revolutionary movements in the Third World was done in the name of national liberation.

Political system 

Anne Applebaum writes that "without exception, the Leninist belief in the one-party state was and is characteristic of every communist regime" and "the Bolshevik use of violence was repeated in every communist revolution." Phrases which were first uttered by Vladimir Lenin and Cheka founder Felix Dzerzhinsky were uttered all over the world. Applebaum states that as late as 1976, Mengistu Haile Mariam unleashed a Red Terror in Ethiopia. To his colleagues in the Bolshevik government, Lenin was quoted as saying: "If we are not ready to shoot a saboteur and White Guardist, what sort of revolution is that?".

Robert Conquest stated that Stalin's purges were not contrary to the principles of Leninism, rather, they were a natural consequence of the system which was established by Lenin, who personally ordered the killing of local groups of class enemy hostages. Alexander Nikolaevich Yakovlev, architect of perestroika and glasnost and later head of the Presidential Commission for the Victims of Political Repression, elaborates on this point, stating: "The truth is that in punitive operations Stalin did not think up anything that was not there under Lenin: executions, hostage taking, concentration camps, and all the rest." Historian Robert Gellately concurs, commenting: "To put it another way, Stalin initiated very little that Lenin had not already introduced or previewed."

Stephen Hicks of Rockford College ascribes the violence characteristic of 20th-century socialist rule to these collectivist regimes' abandonment of protections of civil rights and rejection of the values of civil society. Hicks writes that whereas "in practice every liberal capitalist country has a solid record for being humane, for by and large respecting rights and freedoms, and for making it possible for people to put together fruitful and meaningful lives", in socialism "practice has time and again proved itself more brutal than the worst dictatorships prior to the twentieth century. Each socialist regime has collapsed into dictatorship and begun killing people on a huge scale."

Eric D. Weitz states that the mass killing in communist states is a natural consequence of the failure of the rule of law, commonly seen during periods of social upheaval in the 20th century. For both communist and non-communist mass killings, "genocides occurred at moments of extreme social crisis, often generated by the very policies of the regimes", and are not inevitable but are political decisions. Steven Rosefielde writes that communist rulers had to choose between changing course and "terror-command" and more often than not, they chose the latter. Michael Mann posits that a lack of institutionalized authority structures meant that a chaotic mix of both centralized control and party factionalism were factors which contributed to the killings.

Leaders 

Professor Matthew Krain states that many scholars have pointed to revolutions and civil wars as providing the opportunity for radical leaders and ideologies to gain power and the preconditions for mass killing by the state. Professor Nam Kyu Kim writes that exclusionary ideologies are critical to explaining mass killing, but the organizational capabilities and individual characteristics of revolutionary leaders, including their attitudes towards risk and violence, are also important. Besides opening up political opportunities for new leaders to eliminate their political opponents, revolutions bring to power leaders who are more apt to commit large-scale acts of violence against civilians in order to legitimize and strengthen their own power. Genocide scholar Adam Jones states that the Russian Civil War was very influential on the emergence of leaders like Stalin and it also accustomed people to "harshness, cruelty, terror." Martin Malia called the "brutal conditioning" of the two World Wars important to understanding communist violence, although not its source.

Historian Helen Rappaport describes Nikolay Yezhov, the bureaucrat who was in charge of the NKVD during the Great Purge, as a physically diminutive figure of "limited intelligence" and "narrow political understanding. ... Like other instigators of mass murder throughout history, [he] compensated for his lack of physical stature with a pathological cruelty and the use of brute terror." Russian and world history scholar John M. Thompson places personal responsibility directly on Joseph Stalin. According to him, "much of what occurred only makes sense if it stemmed in part from the disturbed mentality, pathological cruelty, and extreme paranoia of Stalin himself. Insecure, despite having established a dictatorship over the party and country, hostile and defensive when confronted with criticism of the excesses of collectivization and the sacrifices required by high-tempo industrialization, and deeply suspicious that past, present, and even yet unknown future opponents were plotting against him, Stalin began to act as a person beleaguered. He soon struck back at enemies, real or imaginary." Professors Pablo Montagnes and Stephane Wolton posit that the purges in the Soviet Union and China can be attributed to the personalist leadership of Stalin and Mao, who were incentivized by having both control of the security apparatus used to carry out the purges and control of the appointment of replacements for those purged. Slovenian philosopher Slavoj Žižek attributes Mao allegedly viewing human life as disposable to his "cosmic perspective" on humanity.

American historian and author William Rubinstein wrote that "Most of the millions who perished at the hands of Stalin, Mao Tse-tung, Pol Pot and the other communist dictators died because the party's leaders believed they belonged to a dangerous or subversive social class or political grouping."

Comparisons to other mass killings 

Daniel Goldhagen argues that 20th century communist regimes "have killed more people than any other regime type." Other scholars in the fields of communist studies and genocide studies, such as Steven Rosefielde and Benjamin Valentino, have come to similar conclusions. Rosefielde states that it is possible to conclude that the "Red Holocaust" killed more non-combatants than "Ha Shoah" and "Japan's Asian holocaust" combined, and it "was at least as heinous, given the singularity of Hitler's genocide." Rosefielde also writes that "while it is fashionable to mitigate the Red Holocaust by observing that capitalism killed millions of colonials in the twentieth century, primarily through man-made famines, no inventory of such felonious negligent homicides comes close to the Red Holocaust total."

Mark Aarons states that right-wing authoritarian regimes and dictatorships which were backed by Western powers committed atrocities and mass killings that rivaled the atrocities and mass killings that were committed in the communist world, citing examples such as the Indonesian occupation of East Timor, the Indonesian mass killings of 1965–1966, the "disappearances" in Guatemala during the civil war, and the assassinations and state terrorism that were associated with Operation Condor throughout South America. Vincent Bevins argues that the anti-communist mass killings that were perpetrated during the Cold War have been far more impactful on shaping the contemporary world than communist mass killings have been.

According to historian Christian Gerlach, communist mass killings were generally exceeded by atrocities which were committed by those who opposed them; he cites the crushing of the Paris Commune, the terrors of the Spanish Civil War, and the Indonesian mass killings of 1965–66 as examples, stating that "when both sides engaged in terror, the 'red' terror usually paled in comparison with the 'white."

Debate over famines 

According to historian J. Arch Getty, over half of the 100 million deaths which are attributed to communism were due to famines. Stéphane Courtois posits that many communist regimes caused famines in their efforts to forcibly collectivize agriculture and systematically used it as a weapon by controlling the food supply and distributing food on a political basis. Courtois states that "in the period after 1918, only communist countries experienced such famines, which led to the deaths of hundreds of thousands, and in some cases millions, of people. And again in the 1980s, two African countries that claimed to be Marxist–Leninist, Ethiopia and Mozambique, were the only such countries to suffer these deadly famines."

Stephen G. Wheatcroft, R. W. Davies, and Mark Tauger reject the idea that the Ukrainian famine was an act of genocide that was intentionally inflicted by the Soviet government. Wheatcroft says that the Soviet government's policies during the famine were criminal acts of fraud and manslaughter, though not outright murder or genocide. Joseph Stalin biographer Stephen Kotkin supports a similar view, stating that while "there is no question of Stalin's responsibility for the famine" and many deaths could have been prevented if not for the "insufficient" and counterproductive Soviet measures, there is no evidence for Stalin's intention to kill the Ukrainians deliberately. According to history professor Ronald Grigor Suny, most scholars view the famine in Ukraine not as a genocide but rather as the result of badly conceived and miscalculated Soviet economic policies. Getty posits that the "overwhelming weight of opinion among scholars working in the new archives is that the terrible famine of the 1930s was the result of Stalinist bungling and rigidity rather than some genocidal plan." In 2008, the Russian Duma also denied that the famine in Ukraine constituted a genocide, stating that it was not designed to target particular ethnic groups.

In contrast, according to Simon Payaslian, a scholarly consensus classifies the Holodomor in the former Soviet Ukraine as a genocide. Some historians conclude that the famine was planned and exacerbated by Joseph Stalin in order to eliminate a Ukrainian independence movement. This conclusion is supported by Raphael Lemkin. Lemkin (who coined the term "genocide" and was an initiator of the Genocide Convention), James Mace, Norman Naimark, Timothy Snyder and Anne Applebaum have called the Holodomor a genocide and the intentional result of Stalinist policies. According to Lemkin, Holodomor "is a classic example of the Soviet genocide, the longest and most extensive experiment in Russification, namely the extermination of the Ukrainian nation". Lemkin stated that, because Ukrainians were very vulnerable to the racial murder of its chosen parts and way too populous, the government could not follow the pattern of the Holocaust. Instead the extermination consisted of four steps: 1) extermination of the Ukrainian national elite 2) liquidation of the Ukrainian Autocephalous Orthodox Church 3) extermination of a significant part of the Ukrainian peasantry as "custodians of traditions, folklore and music, national language and literature 4) populating the territory with other nationalities with intent of mixing Ukrainians with them, which would eventually lead to the dissolvance of the Ukrainian nation.

Benjamin Valentino writes: "Although not all the deaths due to famine in these cases were intentional, communist leaders directed the worst effects of famine against their suspected enemies and used hunger as a weapon to force millions of people to conform to the directives of the state." Daniel Goldhagen says that in some cases deaths from famine should not be distinguished from mass murder, commenting: "Whenever governments have not alleviated famine conditions, political leaders decided not to say no to mass death – in other words, they said yes." Goldhagen says that instances of this occurred in the Mau Mau rebellion, the Great Leap Forward, the Nigerian Civil War, the Eritrean War of Independence, and the War in Darfur. Martin Shaw posits that if a leader knew the ultimate result of their policies would be mass death by famine, and they continue to enact them anyway, these deaths can be understood as intentional.

Historian Jon Wiener and journalist and Labour aide Seumas Milne, have criticized the emphasis on communism when assigning blame for famines. In a 2002 article for The Guardian, Milne mentions "the moral blindness displayed towards the record of colonialism", and he writes: "If Lenin and Stalin are regarded as having killed those who died of hunger in the famines of the 1920s and 1930s, then Churchill is certainly responsible for the 4 million deaths in the avoidable Bengal famine of 1943." Milne laments that while "there is a much-lauded Black Book of Communism, [there exists] no such comprehensive indictment of the colonial record." Weiner makes a similar assertion while comparing the Holodomor and the Bengal famine of 1943, stating that Winston Churchill's role in the Bengal famine "seems similar to Stalin's role in the Ukrainian famine." Historian Mike Davis, author of Late Victorian Holocausts, draws comparisons between the Great Chinese Famine and the Indian famines of the late 19th century, arguing that in both instances the governments which oversaw the response to the famines deliberately chose not to alleviate conditions and as such bear responsibility for the scale of deaths in said famines. Economic anthropologist Jason Hickel and Dylan Sullivan suggest that the number excess deaths during the apex of British colonialism in India rise to around 100 million, which is greater than all the famine deaths that have been attributed to communist governments combined.

Economics professor Michael Ellman is critical of the fixation on a "uniquely Stalinist evil" when it comes to excess deaths from famines. Ellman posits that mass deaths from famines are not a "uniquely Stalinist evil", commenting that throughout Russian history, famines, and droughts have been a common occurrence, including the Russian famine of 1921–1922, which occurred before Stalin came to power. He also states that famines were widespread throughout the world in the 19th and 20th centuries in countries such as India, Ireland, Russia and China. According to Ellman, the G8 "are guilty of mass manslaughter or mass deaths from criminal negligence because of their not taking obvious measures to reduce mass deaths" and Stalin's "behaviour was no worse than that of many rulers in the nineteenth and twentieth centuries."

Memorials and museums 

Monuments to the victims of communism exist in almost all the capitals of Eastern Europe and there are also several museums which document the crimes which occurred during communist rule. Several scholars, among them Kristen Ghodsee and Laure Neumayer, say that these seek to institutionalize the "victims of communism" narrative as a double genocide theory, or the moral equivalence between the Nazi Holocaust (race murder) and those killed by communist states (class murder), and that works such as The Black Book of Communism played a major role in the criminalization of communism in the European political space in the post Cold War-era. Zoltan Dujisin writes that "the Europeanization of an antitotalitarian 'collective memory' of communism reveals the emergence of a field of anticommunism" and the narrative is proposed by "anticommunist memory entrepreneurs."

See also 

 Communist movements and violence

 Violence by governments in general and comparative studies
 Comparison of Nazism and Stalinism
 Genocide studies
 Holocaust studies
 Political violence
 Soviet and communist studies

References

Notes

Citations

Bibliography

Further reading 
Bibliographies
 
 
 
 
 
 
 
 

General

 
 
 
 
 
 
 
 
 

Soviet Union

 
 
 

China

 
 
 

Cambodia

 
 

Others

External links 
 

Communist repression
Communist states
Genocides
Mass murders
Political and cultural purges